MacGregor Donald Bartley Sharp (born October 1, 1985) is a Canadian professional ice hockey centre who is currently with the SønderjyskE Ishockey of the Metal Ligaen. He has previously played in the National Hockey League (NHL) for the Anaheim Ducks.

Playing career
On March 31, 2009, Sharp signed a two-year, entry level contract with the Anaheim Ducks of the National Hockey League (NHL).

Sharp became the first skater to jump from the ECHL to the National Hockey League (NHL) in the same season without first stopping in the American Hockey League (AHL), playing 15 games with the Bakersfield Condors earning 4 goals, and 10 assists. He played 8 games with the Anaheim Ducks going scoreless, before he was assigned to the San Antonio Rampage.

On February 28, 2011, Sharp was traded along with Maxim Lapierre to the Vancouver Canucks in exchange for Joel Perrault and a third round pick in the 2012 NHL Entry Draft.

On August 2, 2011, Sharp left North America and agreed to a contract with HC Bolzano of the then Italian Serie A. After two seasons amongst the Foxes top scorers, Sharp remained with the club as they transferred leagues into the Austrian Hockey League for a higher level of competitiveness.

On May 30, 2014, Sharp changed European leagues, agreeing to a one-year deal with Schwenninger Wild Wings of the Deutsche Eishockey Liga. In the 2014–15 season, Sharp struggled offensively with just 6 goals and 14 points in 47 games. He was not tendered a new contract upon Schwenninger failing to qualify for the post-season.

On April 15, 2015, Sharp opted to return in hope of further success in Austrian EBEL, signing a one-year deal with the Vienna Capitals.

On July 12, 2019, Sharp signed a one-year deal with SønderjyskE Ishockey of the Danish Metal Ligaen.

Career statistics

Awards and honors

References

External links

1985 births
Abbotsford Heat players
Anaheim Ducks players
Bakersfield Condors (1998–2015) players
Bolzano HC players
Canadian ice hockey centres
Ice hockey people from Alberta
Iowa Stars players
Living people
Minnesota Duluth Bulldogs men's ice hockey players
San Antonio Rampage players
Schwenninger Wild Wings players
Sportspeople from Red Deer, Alberta
Syracuse Crunch players
Undrafted National Hockey League players
Vienna Capitals players
Canadian expatriate ice hockey players in Austria
Canadian expatriate ice hockey players in Italy
Canadian expatriate ice hockey players in Germany